The 1949–50 Sheffield Shield season was the 48th season of the Sheffield Shield, the domestic first-class cricket competition of Australia. New South Wales won the championship.

Table

Statistics

Most Runs
Allan McLean 660

Most Wickets
Jack Iverson 46

References

Sheffield Shield
Sheffield Shield
Sheffield Shield seasons